Simplified Aid For EVA Rescue (SAFER) is a small, self-contained, propulsive backpack system (jet pack) worn during spacewalks, to be used in case of emergency only. If an untethered astronaut were to lose physical contact with the vessel, it would provide free-flying mobility to return to it. It is worn on spacewalks outside the International Space Station (ISS), and was worn on spacewalks outside the Space Shuttle. So far, there has not been an emergency in which it was needed. SAFER is a small, simplified version of the Manned Maneuvering Unit (MMU), which was used for regular maneuvering.

Description 
SAFER is fitted around the life support backpack of the space suit (EMU or Extravehicular Mobility Unit). SAFER in no way interferes with suit mobility. The flight test unit was fitted with a single hand control module rigidly attached to the Display and Control Module (DCM) in front of the suit. The hand controller provided six degrees-of-freedom (DOF) maneuvering via 24 gaseous-nitrogen (GN2) thrusters. Vehicle weight is 85 pounds. The GN2 is stored in four cylindrical tanks, each charged to 3250 psi. Total fuel capacity is 3 pounds which is sufficient to change the vehicle velocity approximately 10 feet/second (ΔV). The unit features very extensive self-test capability.

Application
SAFER is designed to be used as a self-rescue device if in spite of precautions such as tethers, safety grips, and the robot arm an EVA crewmember gets separated and no vehicles can provide rescue capability. SAFER is worn by every ISS crewmember using an Extravehicular Mobility Unit. 

SAFER was co-invented by former astronauts Joseph Kerwin, Paul Cottingham and Ted Christian under a Lockheed contract to NASA for Space Station Freedom. It was later sponsored by the Space Shuttle Program and developed by Lockheed and NASA personnel. SAFER was the design solution to the Shuttle Program's requirement to provide a means of self rescue should an EVA crewmember become untethered during an EVA.

SAFER was first flown on STS-64 September 9, 1994, where an untethered flight test was performed first by astronaut Mark Lee and then Carl Meade. Both astronauts flew the SAFER up and around the Shuttle's Robotic Arm along with a demonstration test of the SAFER's automatic attitude hold feature.  This feature arrests uncontrolled rotation of a detached crewmember expected in an accidental separation.  SAFER has a mass of approximately 83 lb (38 kg) and can provide a total change in velocity (delta-v) of at least 10 ft/s (3 m/s). It was also tested during flight STS-92 when astronauts Peter Wisoff and Michael López-Alegría performed test maneuvers, flying up to 50 feet (15 m) while remaining tethered to the spacecraft.

Complications

The left side latch on the SAFER unit became unlatched during an EVA by astronaut Piers Sellers on STS-121 while testing shuttle repair techniques. The latch had been inadvertently bumped and moved to the unlatch position.  As a precaution, Mike Fossum tethered it to him and the spacewalk continued. In subsequent spacewalks, the latches were secured with Kapton tape, a space-rated form of adhesive tape, to prevent the latches from inadvertently opening.

See also
Single-person spacecraft

References

External links
 
 Video of SAFER being attached

Human spaceflight
Extravehicular activity